The discography of Samantha Mumba, an Irish-Zambian singer who rose to fame in 2000, consists of one studio album, one EP, one compilation, and eleven singles.

Albums

Studio albums

Compilation albums

Extended plays

Singles

As lead artist

As featured artist

Music videos

References

Pop music discographies
Discographies of Irish artists